Isospidia is a genus of moths belonging to the subfamily Drepaninae.

Species
 Isospidia angustipennis Warren, 1904
 Isospidia brunneola Holland, 1893

References

Drepaninae
Drepanidae genera